Jason Bowen (born November 9, 1973) is a Canadian retired professional ice hockey player. He was a defenceman and left winger who played in 77 National Hockey League (NHL) games with the Philadelphia Flyers and Edmonton Oilers over parts of six seasons.

Playing career
After serving a four-year apprenticeship in the Western Hockey League with the Tri-City Americans, he was drafted by the Philadelphia Flyers in the first round of the 1992 NHL Entry Draft, 15th overall, where he began his six-season NHL career, alternating with the Flyers' American Hockey League affiliate, the Philadelphia Phantoms.

Bowen then moved to the Edmonton Oilers, also in the NHL, where he played four games and then played for the Hamilton Bulldogs, the Hershey Bears and Saint John Flames, all in the AHL. Moving to Belfast in 2000, he has played for the Scottish Eagles in Glasgow and then the Guildford Flames in the BNL before returning to the Giants.

Career statistics

External links
 

 

1973 births
Ayr Scottish Eagles players
Belfast Giants players
British National League (1996–2005) players
Canadian ice hockey defencemen
Canadian ice hockey left wingers
Edmonton Oilers players
Guildford Flames players
Hamilton Bulldogs (AHL) players
Hershey Bears players
Ice hockey people from British Columbia
Living people
National Hockey League first-round draft picks
People from the Regional District of Mount Waddington
Philadelphia Flyers draft picks
Philadelphia Flyers players
Philadelphia Phantoms players
Saint John Flames players
Tri-City Americans players
Canadian expatriate ice hockey players in England
Canadian expatriate ice hockey players in Scotland
Canadian expatriate ice hockey players in Northern Ireland
Canadian expatriate ice hockey players in the United States